The lowveld largemouth (Serranochromis meridianus) is a species of cichlid native to lakes and rivers of South Africa and Mozambique.  This species can reach a length of  TL.  It is popular as a gamefish.

References

Lowveld largemouth
Freshwater fish of South Africa
Fish described in 1967
Taxonomy articles created by Polbot